Palpita annulata is a moth in the family Crambidae. It was described by Johan Christian Fabricius in 1794. It is found in India (including the Andamans and Nicobar Islands), Sri Lanka, Myanmar, China, Taiwan and Queensland, Australia.

The larvae feed on the foliage of various plants, including Ligustrum quihoui and Ligustrum vicaryi.

References

Moths described in 1794
Palpita
Moths of Asia
Moths of Australia